The 2004 Big League World Series took place from July 30-August 7 in Easley, South Carolina, United States. Easley, South Carolina defeated Williamsport,  Pennsylvania in the championship game. It was South Carolina's second straight championship.

Teams

Results

Group A

Group B

Elimination Round

References

Big League World Series
Big League World Series